Senecio integerrimus is a species of flowering plant in the aster family known by the common names lambstongue ragwort and tall western groundsel. It is native to western and central North America, where it grows in grassland, forest, and other habitat. The herbage is slightly hairy to woolly or cobwebby. The inflorescence bears several flower heads in a cluster, the middle, terminal head often largest and held on a shorter peduncle, making the cluster look flat. The heads contain many disc florets and usually 8 or 13 ray florets which may be yellow to cream to white in color. Some heads lack ray florets.

References

External links
Jepson Manual Treatment
USDA Plants Profile
Flora of North America
Washington Burke Museum
Photo gallery

integerrimus
Flora of North America